Cyrillia linearis is a species of sea snail, a marine gastropod mollusk in the family Raphitomidae.

Description
The shell is fusiform and turriculate. It has an elevated and acute spire. The twelve whorls are convex and longitudinally costated (twelve ribs on the body whorl). They are transversally sharply striated with 6-7 elevated lines, which run along the volutions. They are rather broader over the ribs and very sharp between them The outer lip is thickened on the outside with an obtuse varix or rib, but smooth within. The siphonal canal is short, rather broad and slightly inflected.

Distribution
This marine species occurs in European waters from Norway to the Azores; in the Mediterranean Sea. Fossils were found in Pliocene strata in Italy.

References

External links
 Montagu, G. (1803). Testacea Britannica or Natural History of British Shells, Marine, Land, and Fresh-Water, Including the Most Minute: Systematically Arranged and Embellished with Figures. J. White, London, Vol. 1, xxxvii + 291 pp;; Vol. 2, pp. 293–606, pl. 1-16
 Bucquoy E., Dautzenberg P. & Dollfus G. (1882-1886). Les mollusques marins du Roussillon. Tome Ier. Gastropodes. Paris, J.B. Baillière & fils 570 p., 66 pl.
 Smith E.H. (1967). Two new species of British turrids. The Veliger. 10(1): 1-4
 Donovan E. (1800-1804). The natural history of British shells : including figures and descriptions of all the species hitherto discovered in Great Britain, systematically arranged in the Linnean manner, with scientific and general observations on each; in five vo by E. Donovan
 Scacchi A. (1833). Osservazioni Zoologiche. Napoli, Tipi della Società Tipografica. 1: 1-12
 Bellardi L. (1877), I molluschi dei terreni terziarii del Piemonte e della Liguria /
 Blainville H. M. (D. de) (1828-1830). Malacozoaires ou Animaux Mollusques. [in Faune Française. Levrault, Paris 320 p., 48 pl. [livr. 18 (1828), p. 1-80; livr. 2 (1829), p. 81-176; livr. 23 (1829), p. 177-240; livr. 28 (1830), p. 241-320 ]
 Risso, A. (1826-1827). Histoire naturelle des principales productions de l'Europe Méridionale et particulièrement de celles des environs de Nice et des Alpes Maritimes. Paris, Levrault:. . 3(XVI): 1-480, 14 pls
 https://doi.org/10.1093/mollus/eyz022
 Biolib.cz: Cyrillia linearis
 Natural History Museum, Rotterdam: Raphitoma linearis

linearis
Gastropods described in 1803